The Whitefield House and Gray Cottage are two historic homes on the Ephrata Tract in Nazareth, Northampton County, Pennsylvania. Construction on both buildings began in 1740, by Moravian settlers who moved to Nazareth after the failure of their mission to Native Americans and Europeans in the Savannah, Georgia area, 1735–1740. The two structures were added to the National Register of Historic Places on May 1, 1980. The Ephrata Tract and its buildings are owned by the Moravian Historical Society, and act as the Society's headquarters.

1740/1743 Whitefield House 
The Whitefield House is a stone building measuring 56 feet long and 35 feet wide. It is named for George Whitefield (1714–1770), who hired a group of Moravians from Georgia to build the house as a school for orphaned slaves. Only a foundation was built however, after theological disputes between Whitefield and the Moravians caused the group to purchase the town of Bethlehem, Pennsylvania. It was here they established a Moravian community. When Whitefield went bankrupt, the Moravians purchased 5000 acres of land from him, which would later become the town of Nazareth. They completed the Whitefield House in 1743, just in time for it to be used as a home for 32 couples coming over from England. The house has been in Moravian hands for years, and has operated as a place of worship, boarding school, place for mission work, nursery, the Moravian Theological Seminary, and apartments for furloughed missionaries. Currently, the Moravian Historical Society uses the building as its historical museum, administrative offices, and gift shop.

1740 Gray Cottage 
The Gray Cottage is a -story log building with a wood shake covered gable roof. Its name possibly comes from its aged gray coloring. It was restored in 1971 to be used as a private residence, and it is the oldest American Moravian building still standing. The log house was built in October 1740 by the Moravians to shelter themselves during the winter. The building has been used a boys' and girls' school, a choir house for widows, and a nursery. The Moravian Historical Society owns and maintains the building, and rents it out to tenants.

Gallery

References

External links
The Moravian Historical Society website

History museums in Pennsylvania
Houses on the National Register of Historic Places in Pennsylvania
Houses completed in 1740
Houses in Northampton County, Pennsylvania
Moravian settlement in Pennsylvania
Museums in Northampton County, Pennsylvania
Religious museums in Pennsylvania
National Register of Historic Places in Northampton County, Pennsylvania